The Dhobi Khola (sometimes known as Rudramati) is a tributary of the Bagmati River which is almost entirely in the district of Kathmandu District. The river originates from Shivapuri Hill and Muhanpokhari, north of Kathmandu Valley, and it is mostly fed by springs and rainfall. Dhobi Khola's mouth is located at Bijuli Bazar (sometimes called Buddhanagar) where it merges with the Bagmati River. 

Dhobi Khola's banks have been used as a dumping ground by private organizations and municipalities. In 2018, volunteers had removed about 30 metric tonnes of solid waste from the river, as part of the Mega Bagmati Clean-up campaign. The same year, 5 ft in length and 1 ½ ft in width "headless, armless figure has been dubbed simply as a ‘nari murti’ or female figure" was found dating back to the Licchavi-era. About 4 ropani (0.5 acres) of land belonging to the river was "illegally registered in the names of individuals under the pretext of updating the land survey map".

References

Citations
 

D